Come tu mi vuoi is a 2007 Italian comedy film directed by Volfango De Biasi. The stars, Cristiana Capotondi and Nicolas Vaporidis had previously appeared together in the film Notte prima degli esami.

Plot
Studious college girl, spoiled rich boy. Romantic comedy on the theme of the ugly duckling.

Cast
 Cristiana Capotondi as Giada
 Nicolas Vaporidis as  Riccardo
 Giulia Steigerwalt as  Fiamma
 Niccolò Senni as  Loris
 Elisa Di Eusanio as  Sara
 Paola Carleo as  Alessia
 Paola Roberti as  Katia
 Marco Foschi as  Hermes
 Roberto Di Palma  as Peppe
 Luigi Diberti as  Giuseppe
 Gianfranco Barra as Professor

References

External links

Official site

2007 films
2000s Italian-language films
Italian comedy films
2007 comedy films
Films directed by Volfango De Biasi